Mimobdella is a genus of leeches belonging to the family Erpobdellidae.

The species of this genus are found in Japan.

Species
Species:

Mimobdella africana 
Mimobdella buettikoferi 
Mimobdella japonica

References

Leeches